This is the list of banks in Vietnam, as of 2019.

State-owned Banks

Private Joint-Stock Commercial Banks
 Orient Commercial Joint Stock Bank (OCB)
 Asia Commercial Bank (ACB)
 Tien Phong Commercial Joint Stock Bank (TP Bank)
Hanoi Building Joint-stock Commercial Bank 
Maritime Commercial Joint Stock  Bank (Maritime Bank) 
Sai Gon Thuong Tin Commercial Joint-stock Bank (Sacombank)

Vietnam Prosperity Joint Stock Commercial Bank (VPBank) 
Viet Nam Technological and Commercial Joint Stock Bank (Techcombank)
Military  Commercial Joint Stock Bank (MB Bank)
Bac A Commercial Joint Stock Bank (Bac A Bank)
Vietnam International Commercial Joint Stock Bank (VIB)
Southeast Asia Commercial Joint Stock  Bank (SeABank)
Housing development Commercial Joint Stock Bank (HDBank)
Southern Commercial Joint Stock  Bank
Viet Capital Commercial Joint Stock Bank (Viet Capital Bank) 
Sai Gon Joint Stock Commercial Bank
Viet A Commercial Joint Stock Bank 
Saigon-Hanoi Commercial Joint Stock Bank
Global Petro Commercial Joint Stock Bank
An Binh Commercial Joint Stock Bank
Nam Viet Commercial Joint Stock Bank
Kien Long Commercial Joint Stock Bank
Mekong Commercial Bank
Viet Nam thuong Tin Commercial Joint Stock Bank
OCEAN Commercial Joint Stock Bank
Petrolimex Group Commercial Joint Stock Bank
Western Rural Commercial Joint Stock Bank
Great Trust Joint Stock Commercial Bank
Great Asia Commercial Joint Stock Bank
LienViet Post Commercial Joint Stock Bank
Mekong Development Joint Stock Commercial Bank
Bao Viet Joint Stock Commercial Bank
Western Bank (Phuong Tay Bank)
Viet Nam Public Bank (PVcomBank)

Branches of foreign banks
Gatehouse Bank of United Kingdom
 Standard Chartered Bank
 ANZ exited Vietnam market in 2018 and sold local operations to Shinhan Bank (Korea)
 Citibank Vietnam exited Vietnam market in 2022 and sold local operations to United Overseas Bank (Singapore)
 Siam Commercial Bank
 Bangkok Bank
 BOA closed
 BNP Paribas
 Hong Leong Bank
 CIMB Bank
 Natixis
 Deutsche Bank
 Mizuho Bank
 HFC Bank
 The Bank of Tokyo-Mitsubishi UFJ
 Commonwealth Bank of Australia
 HSBC
 Public Bank Vietnam
 Shinhan Bank
 KEB Hana Bank
 Industrial Bank of Korea
 Scotiabank
 JP Morgan Chase Bank
 Bank of China
 Maybank
 Woori Bank
 Bank of India
 United Overseas Bank

Foreign Joint-Venture Banks
 Indovina Bank - the first joint-venture bank in Vietnam. The Joint-venture partner are Vietinbank and Cathay United Bank in Taiwan
 Vietnam – Russia Joint Venture Bank. VRB is a joint venture between the two leading banks in Vietnam and Russia, Bank for Investment and Development of Vietnam (BIDV) and Bank for Foreign Trade of Russia (VTB)

References

External links 

 System of Credit Institutions, The State Bank of Vietnam
 List of banks on Vietnam

Vietnam
Banks
Vietnam